Kamal El-Din Shemais (born 5 September 1953) is an Egyptian sports shooter. He competed in the men's 10 metre air rifle event at the 1984 Summer Olympics.

References

1953 births
Living people
Egyptian male sport shooters
Olympic shooters of Egypt
Shooters at the 1984 Summer Olympics
Place of birth missing (living people)